Ralph Gold is a British businessman. He is a former director of English football team, Birmingham City. Gold is a co-founder of the Ann Summers the Knickerbox retail chain and is the brother of David Gold who was also a director at Birmingham City and is a director of Ann Summers and Knickerbox.

Ann Summers
Gold acquired the Ann Summers chain with his brother David in 1972. In December 2007 David bought out Ralph with Ralph taking a £56.5m dividend as part of the sale.

Birmingham City
Gold was a director of Birmingham City before selling his 12.50% share for £10m to Carson Yeung. Gold, his brother David and David Sullivan had acquired the club in 1993 for £1.

References 

Living people
English businesspeople
Birmingham City F.C. directors and chairmen
English people of Jewish descent
Date of birth missing (living people)
Place of birth missing (living people)
British businesspeople in retailing
Year of birth missing (living people)